Austrotriton bassi is a species of predatory sea snail, a marine gastropod mollusk in the family Cymatiidae.

Distribution
This marine species occurs in the Bass Strait off Tasmania

References

External links
 Angas, G. F. (1869). Descriptions of twelve new species of land and marine shells from Australia and the Solomon Islands. Proceedings of the Zoological Society of London. 1869: 45–49
 Strong E.E., Puillandre N., Beu A.G., Castelin M. & Bouchet P. (2019). Frogs and tuns and tritons – A molecular phylogeny and revised family classification of the predatory gastropod superfamily Tonnoidea (Caenogastropoda). Molecular Phylogenetics and Evolution. 130: 18-34

Cymatiidae